North America Western Asia Holdings, (NAWAH) is an investment firm founded in 2011.  It was established by Hyatt Hotels executive chairman Thomas Pritzker and former Pentagon official Paul Brinkley to build businesses in the Middle East, Central Asia and North Africa.

NAWAH currently has two primary business units based in Iraq. NAWAH Port Management and NAWAH Supply & Distribution, both are designed to help service the growing supply chain needs of a country with a rising demand for improved logistics.

NAWAH Business Units

NAWAH Port Management
NAWAH Port Management (NPM) operates a modernized, containerized berth at the Port of Basra (also known as Al Maqal Port). Located in the heart of urban Basra and less than 100 km from several of Iraq's largest oil and gas fields, the Port of Basra is ideally situated to offer superior ease of access to commercial centers as well as the major oil and gas developments in Iraq.

NAWAH Supply & Distribution
NAWAH Supply & Distribution (NSD) is the exclusive distributor in Iraq for MRC Global, the largest global distributor of pipe, valve, flange, fitting and other oil-related product and equipment needs of the world's leading oil companies operating in Iraq. NSD's operational headquarters is in a highly secure complex situated in Zubair, ensuring the rapid transportation of goods to the oil fields that surround it.

Modernizing the Port of Basra

NAWAH announced in early October 2012 that it had entered into a 10-year, $14 million agreement with Iraq's Ministry of Transportation and General Company for the Ports of Iraq to modernize the Port of Basra.

The project, completed in October 2014, in record time, saw the construction of a 20,000 square meter lay down yard and a new administrative headquarters as well as being equipped with a Liebherr 180 Mobile Harbor Crane and a Liebherr 645 Reachstacker.

History and Leadership

Thomas Pritzker and Paul Brinkley met while Brinkley was the Deputy Undersecretary of Defense leading the Task Force for Business and Stability Operations, the Department of Defense agency tasked with drawing investors first to Iraq and later Afghanistan.  At the Task Force, Brinkley recruited dozens of American business executives to tour Iraq and Afghanistan, including top officials at Honeywell, IBM, and Boeing.  Several firms later made investments in those countries.

In 2010, Brinkley told the World Affairs Council of Northern California that:

In 2008, Pritzker visited Baghdad with Morgan Stanley Vice Chairman William Strong and CF Industries Holdings CEO Stephen Wilson. The three later wrote an editorial in the Chicago Tribune about their experience. In 2011, Pritzker toured Bamyan Province, Afghanistan with his wife on a Task Force-sponsored trip.

Notes

External links
 NAWAH Official website
 Nawah employees on the OpenSecrets Revolving Door database

Investment companies of the United States
Financial services companies established in 2011